Nizhalkuthu is a 2002 Indian film in Malayalam directed, written and co-produced by Adoor Gopalakrishnan. The film explores the recesses of the human consciousness. It stars Oduvil Unnikrishnan in the lead with actors Narain, Murali, Sukumari, Reeja, Nedumudi Venu, Vijayaraghavan, Jagathi Sreekumar  and Tara Kalyan in supporting roles. It premiered at the Venice Film Festival in the Orizzonti section and received critical acclaim. The film was awarded the FIPRESCI Prize at the festival. Cahiers du Cinéma hailed the film as "the most poetic film this year in Venice".

Overview
The title of the film Nizhalkuthu (Shadow Kill) refers to a popular play Nizhalkuthu Attakatha, adapted from the Mahabharata, about the inherent unjustness of certain punishments. In the play, the Kauravas force a witch hunter to kill the Pandavas by stabbing their shadows. However, the witch hunter's wife finds this out and is enraged. To punish her husband by making him feel what Kunti, the mother of Pandavas must feel, she kills their child in the same way.

The film reflects that death penalty is probably in the same vein. We may---like the witch hunter's wife---be handing out punishments that are equally ridiculous under the false perception that we are doing justice, if not being directly criminal like the witch hunter.

Adoor's usual cinematographer Mankada Ravi Varma filmed half of the project. But he was later replaced by Sunny Joseph, since the former fell ill and was later found to be suffering from Alzheimer's disease.

Plot
The plot is set in the 1940s in a village of Travancore, British India. Kaliyappan, the last hangman of Travancore is dragging his remaining life by consuming alcohol and worshipping the Mother Goddess. The reason for this self-destruction is the remorse born out of the feeling that the last man he hanged was innocent.

While pulling on his life by boozing, worshiping the Goddess and treating ailing people with the ash obtained by burning the hanging rope, one day the King's messenger once again arrives with the King's order of appointing him for executing a convict termed as 'a killer, proved beyond doubt'. He leaves for the jail with his Gandhian, freedom fighter son to assist him in his job.

As a tradition, the hangman has to spend the eve of the execution awake. When alcohol fails to keep Kaliyappan awake, the jailer starts telling a 'spicy tale' to keep him awake, the tale of a 13-year-old girl raped and killed by her own brother-in-law and an innocent musician boy convicted for this charge.

When Kaliyappan discovers that the condemned person he is about to hang is the musician boy, he breaks down. The job of executing the convict is passed on to his assistant, his son. The Gandhian, freedom fighter son completes the job. His motivations are not spelt out, but the choice of title hints that the son perhaps punishes the father by reminding him that any of his prior executions may have been a farce just like this.

Just like the witch hunter's wife in Mahabharata, the son's sense of punishment completely ignores the innocent victim who would be executed. We are reminded that what we think of something as just may not always be so.

Cast
Oduvil Unnikrishnan as Kaliyappan the executioner
Sukumari as Marakatam, his wife
Mallika(Reeja) as Mallika, the younger daughter
Thara Kalyan as Madhavy, the older daughter
Murali as Vasu, Madhavy's husband
Sivakumar as Mallika's lover
Shivaji
Narain (actor) as Muthu, Kaliyappan's son
Nedumudi Venu as Jailer
Vijayaraghavan as Jailer
Jagathy Sreekumar as Maharajah's Officer
Rachana Narayanankutty 
Indrans as Barber
Kukku Parameshwaram as Woman seeking treatment in Kaliyappan

Crew
Sound Recording: N. Harikumar

Sound Editing: V. P. Krishnakumar, N. Harikumar, Dominique Vieillard

Critical reception
The film received critical praise. Richard Phillips of World Socialist Web Site said, "Shadow Kill provides an accurate and disturbing glimpse of the state apparatus created by the British colonial rulers and their local Indian agents and the treatment of those at the bottom of the pecking order. It is a dark and disturbing film with strong performances by its experienced cast. Oduvil Unnikrishnan as Kaliyappan is particularly noteworthy."

Laura and Robin Clifford of Reeling Reviews rated the film C+ and said, "While beautiful to look at, the film is slow moving and oddly sadistic."

Gautaman Bhaskaran of The Hindu stated, "Adoor Gopalakrishnan's latest celluloid creation is a profound statement on capital punishment. At the core is the human emotion of guilt which tests and tortures the hangman and gives the picture a poignantly novel angle."

The reviewer of Rediff.com concluded, "Nizhalkuthu, in the final analysis, comes across as a masterwork; a film that seeps in through the eyes and envelops the mind and doesn't let go".

Awards
National Film Awards
 National Film Award for Best Feature Film in Malayalam - Adoor Gopalakrishnan

 Kerala State Film Awards
 Best Actor - Oduvil Unnikrishnan
 Second Best Actor - Jagathy Sreekumar
 Best Costume Designer - S. B. Satheesh
 Best Editor - Ajithkumar
 Best Sound Recordist - N. Harikumar
 Kerala State Film Award for Best Photography - Mankada Ravivarma, Sunny Joseph 
 Kerala State Film Award for Best Processing Lab - Prasad Laboratory, Chennai

 Others
 Bombay International Film Festival - FIPRESCI Prize
 John Abraham Award for Best Malayalam Film - Adoor Gopalakrishnan

References

External links
 
 Stills and pictures at Outnow.ch

2002 drama films
2002 films
2000s Malayalam-language films
Films about capital punishment
Films scored by Ilaiyaraaja
Films shot in Thiruvananthapuram
Films shot in Kollam
Films shot in Alappuzha
Best Malayalam Feature Film National Film Award winners